Tenderly is a studio album by Pat Boone, released in 1959 on Dot Records.

Track listing

References 

1959 albums
Pat Boone albums
Dot Records albums